In Greek mythology, Aepytus (Ancient Greek: Αἵπυτος) was one of the mythical kings of Arcadia who originally ruled over Phaesana on the Alpheius.

Family 
Aepytus was the son of King Elatus. He was the father of Tlesenor and Peirithous.

Mythology 
When Cleitor, the son of Azan, died without leaving any issue, Aepytus succeeded him and became king of the Arcadians, a part of whose country was called after him Aepytis. He is said to have been killed during the chase on Mount Sepia by the bite of a venomous snake. His tomb there was still shown in the time of Pausanias, and he was anxious to see it, because it was mentioned by Homer.

Notes

References 

 Homer, The Iliad with an English Translation by A.T. Murray, Ph.D. in two volumes. Cambridge, MA., Harvard University Press; London, William Heinemann, Ltd. 1924. . Online version at the Perseus Digital Library.
Homer, Homeri Opera in five volumes. Oxford, Oxford University Press. 1920. . Greek text available at the Perseus Digital Library.
 Pausanias, Description of Greece with an English Translation by W.H.S. Jones, Litt.D., and H.A. Ormerod, M.A., in 4 Volumes. Cambridge, MA, Harvard University Press; London, William Heinemann Ltd. 1918. . Online version at the Perseus Digital Library
Pausanias, Graeciae Descriptio. 3 vols. Leipzig, Teubner. 1903.  Greek text available at the Perseus Digital Library.
 Pindar, Odes translated by Diane Arnson Svarlien. 1990. Online version at the Perseus Digital Library.
 Pindar, The Odes of Pindar including the Principal Fragments with an Introduction and an English Translation by Sir John Sandys, Litt.D., FBA. Cambridge, MA., Harvard University Press; London, William Heinemann Ltd. 1937. Greek text available at the Perseus Digital Library.

Princes in Greek mythology
Mythological kings of Arcadia
Kings in Greek mythology
Arcadian characters in Greek mythology
Arcadian mythology